Sujapur Assembly constituency is an assembly constituency in Malda district in the Indian state of West Bengal.

Overview
As per orders of the Delimitation Commission, No. 53 Sujapur Assembly constituency covers Alipur I, Alipur II, Bamongram Mashimpur, Gayeshbari, Jalalpur, Jalua Badhal, Kalia Chak II, Mozampur, Naoda Jadupur, Silampur I, Silampur II and Sujapur gram panchayats of Kaliachak I community development block.

Sujapur Assembly constituency is part of No. 8 Maldaha Dakshin (Lok Sabha constituency). It was earlier part of Malda (Lok Sabha constituency).

Members of Legislative Assembly

Election results

2021
In the 2021 election, Md. Abdul Ghani of AITC, defeated his nearest rival, Isha Khan Choudhury of INC

2016
In the 2016 election, Isha Khan Chowdhury of INC defeated his nearest rival Abu Nasar Khan Choudhury of TMC.

2011
In the 2011 election, Abu Naser Khan Chowdhury of Congress defeated his nearest rival Sekh Ketabuddin of CPI(M).

1977–2009
In the by-election held in 2009, subsequent to the election of the sitting MLA Mausam Noor from Maldaha Uttar (Lok Sabha constituency), Abu Nasar Khan Choudhury  of Congress won the seat. In an earlier by-election held in the same year, caused by the death of the sitting MLA, Rubi Noor, Mausam Noor of Congress defeated Haji Ketabuddin of CPI(M). Contests in most years were multi cornered but only winners and runners are being mentioned.

In the 2006, 2001, 1996 and 1991, Rubi Noor of Congress won the Suzapur assembly seat defeating her nearest rivals Hamidur Rahman of CPI(M) in 2006, Abdur Rauf of CPI(M) in 2001 and 1996, and Kowsar Ali of CPI(M) in 1991. Humayoun Chowdhury of Congress defeated Kowsar Ali of CPI(M) in 1987 and Mamtaz Begum of CPI(M) in 1982. A. B. A. Ghani Khan Choudhury of Congress defeated Habibur of CPI(M) in 1977.

1957–1972
A. B. A. Ghani Khan Choudhury of Congress won in 1972, 1971, 1969 and 1967. Ashadulla Choudhury of Congress won in 1962. Manoranjan Mishra, Independent, won in 1957. Prior to that the Sazapur seat did not exist.

References

Assembly constituencies of West Bengal
Politics of Malda district